Eel Pie Publishing was a publishing house founded by musician and author Pete Townshend in 1977, and named after Eel Pie Island. It was part of the Eelpie Group of Companies including Eel Pie Recording Production Ltd (renamed Honorable Ltd) which was set up in 1970 by Pete Townshend.

The principal activities of the group of companies were music studios, including Eel Pie Studios, recording and publishing. It used to have a website, but it is now closed.

Eel Pie Publishing Ltd itself was dissolved in September 2014, but other parts of the Eel Pie group established by Townshend remain.

Published works
In 1979 or 1980, Eel Pie published a version of Vivian Stanshall's Sir Henry at Rawlinson End, edited by his wife Ki Longfellow-Stanshall, with stills from the film of the same title.

References

External links
Eelpie Store

Book publishing companies of the United Kingdom
Pete Townshend